A bathtub is a large container for holding water to bathe in.

Bathtub may also refer to:

The Bathtub, the underground foundation of the World Trade Center
The Bathtub (film), a 2016 German-Austrian short film
Bathtub curve, a concept in engineering
"Chapter Seven: The Bathtub", an episode of Stranger Things

See also